Estadio Luna Park (commonly known as Luna Park) is a multi-purpose arena in Buenos Aires. Located at the corner of Avenida Corrientes and Avenida Bouchard; in the San Nicolás neighborhood. Initially, the arena primarily hosted boxing and other sporting events. In the 1950s, it was expanded to host stage shows and concerts.

The stadium has hosted countless internationally famous personalities, including Pope John Paul II, several ballets, tennis and volleyball matches, world championship and important non-championship boxing fights involving Nicolino Locche, Hugo Corro, Santos Laciar, Carlos Monzón, Omar Narvaez, Juan Roldán, Julio César Vásquez and many other famous boxers, circuses, the Harlem Globetrotters, Holiday on Ice and many more.

The arena also hosted the 1950 FIBA World Championship, the final phase of the 1990 Basketball World Championship and the 1976 Basketball Intercontinental Cup in which Real Madrid won the competition.

The arena also hosted the Six Days of Buenos Aires cycle race.

History
At the beginning of the twentieth century, Buenos Aires was inhabited by thousands of immigrants from Europe. Additionally, there was an abundance of tourists from throughout the Americas. In 1910, Italian merchant Domingo Pace built Luna Park, an open street fair in the heart of the city. By the 1920s, the amusement park became the playground of the aristocrats and wealthy in Argentina. With the change of scenery, the park began to decline and by 1929, many of the rides were abandoned.

In 1931, Ismael Pace (son of Domingo) and boxing legend Jose Pepe Lectoure purchased land from the city. With the decline of Luna Park, Pace envisioned creating a sports arena in the likes of Madison Square Garden and the Berliner Sportpalast. Before opening in 1932, the arena went through three names: Estadio de Corrientes y Bouchard, Catedral del Boxeo then Palacio de los Deportes before settling on Estadio Luna Park (in remembrance of the now torn down amusement park).

Opening February 1932 as an opening air venue and carnival. The arena hosted a boxing match every Saturday, with first match being held on 5 March 1932. At this time, the arena could sit 22,000 spectators. During the off season, the arena ran rampant with the homeless, causing the venue to become an enclosed space in 1934. During the Second World War, the arena became the site of many Nazi and Fascist rallies. In 1944, during a charity event to benefit the victims of an earthquake in San Juan, Eva Duarte and Juan Perón met for the first time.

In the 1950s, the arena began to decline. Lectoure and Pace were pressured by the city to seek better revenue. In 1951, renovations began for the arena in the style of Art Deco, substantially, the capacity of the arena was reduced. Before construction ended, Pace and Lectoure died. Ownership of the venue was given to Lectoure's son, Juan Carlos Lectoure. Known as Tito, he converted the arena into the site for concerts and it became a major venue for the Argentine rock scene.

In 2007, the arena was declared a National Historic Monument. After 80 years, the Lectoure family no longer owned the historic venue. After the death of Tito's wife, Ernestina Devecchi de Lectoure (in 2013), ownership of the arena was transferred to Sociedad Salesiana de San Juan Bosco and Cáritas Argentina.

Recordings
 On August 19 & 20, 2012, the American progressive metal band Dream Theater recorded Live at Luna Park.
 On May 29, 2013, the Finnish singer Tarja Turunen recorded Luna Park Ride.
 Emir Kusturica & No Smoking Orchestra released in 2005 the live DVD Live Is A Miracle In Buenos Aires, recorded at Luna Park.
 Huracanes en Luna plateada live album by Los Piojos was released in 2002.
 El Regreso, by Andrés Calamaro, was released in 2005.

Notable concerts

'Other artists that have performed at Luna Park include: Blue Man Group, Harlem Globetrotters, other events include Diego Maradona's wedding (1989) and the funerals of Carlos Gardel (1935), Julio Sosa (1964) and Ringo Bonavena (1976).

Gallery

References

External links

 

Luna Park
Indoor arenas in Argentina
1931 establishments in Argentina
Basketball venues in Argentina
Volleyball venues in Argentina
Boxing venues in Argentina